The following events occurred in May 1953:

May 1, 1953 (Friday)
The final of the 1952–53 DFB-Pokal football tournament is held at the Rheinstadion in Düsseldorf, Germany, and is won by Rot-Weiss Essen.
 Born:
 Mayumi Aoki, Japanese Olympic champion swimmer; in Yamaga, Kumamoto
 Glen Ballard (born Basil Glen Ballard Jr.), American songwriter and record producer; in Natchez, Mississippi
 Died: Everett Shinn, 76, American painter

May 2, 1953 (Saturday)
 BOAC Flight 783 breaks up in midair and crashes near Calcutta, India, killing all 43 people aboard.
 Hussein is crowned King of Jordan. On the same day, Faisal II, Hussein's cousin, assumes his constitutional powers as King of Iraq.
The FA Cup Final is held at Wembley Stadium in London, UK. It will become known as the "Matthews Final" as a result of Blackpool winger Stanley Matthews scoring a hat-trick to enable his team to defeat Bolton Wanderers.
 Dark Star, ridden by Henry Moreno, wins the 1953 Kentucky Derby at Churchill Downs in Louisville, Kentucky, United States.
 Born:
 Valery Gergiev, Russian-Ossetian conductor; in Moscow, Russian Soviet Federative Socialist Republic
 Jamaal Wilkes (born Jackson Keith Wilkes), American basketball player; in Berkeley, California
 Died: Wallace Bryant, 89, American Olympic archer and portraitist

May 3, 1953 (Sunday)
The 39th Liège–Bastogne–Liège cycle race is won by Belgian rider Alois De Hertog.
The 67th All-Ireland Senior Hurling Championship begins in Ireland.
 Born:
 Bruce Hall, American musician and singer (REO Speedwagon); in Champaign, Illinois
 Salman Hashimikov, Soviet heavyweight amateur and professional wrestler; in Kazakh Soviet Socialist Republic
 Jake Hooker (born Jerry Mamberg), Israeli-American guitarist and songwriter; in Haifa, Israel (d. 2014)
 Gary Young, American musician, in Mamaroneck, New York

May 4, 1953 (Monday)
 American author Ernest Hemingway wins the Pulitzer Prize for Fiction for The Old Man and the Sea.
 Born:
 Masashi Ebara (born Masashi Ehara), Japanese actor and voice actor; in Kanagawa Prefecture
 Pia Zadora (born Pia Alfreda Schipani), American actress and singer
 Died:
 T. Tertius Noble, 85, English-born organist and composer
 Alexandre Pharamond, 76, French Olympic champion rugby union player
 Edward Shanks, 60, English writer, war poet and journalist

May 5, 1953 (Tuesday)
The 33rd Emperor's Cup Final (association football) is held in Kyoto, Japan, and is won by All Kwangaku.
 Aldous Huxley first tries the psychedelic hallucinogen mescaline, inspiring his book The Doors of Perception.
 Born:
 Ibrahim Zakzaky, Nigerian Shia Islam cleric; in Zaria
 Dieter Zetsche, German auto executive; in Istanbul, Turkey

May 6, 1953 (Wednesday)
 In Chile, the 1953 Concepción earthquake causes significant damage and kills twelve people.
 Born:
 Aleksandr Akimov, Soviet engineer who was the shift supervisor during the events of the Chernobyl disaster; in Novosibirsk, Russian SFSR (d. 1986, acute radiation syndrome)
 Tony Blair, Prime Minister of the United Kingdom; in Edinburgh
 Michelle Courchesne, Canadian politician; in Trois-Rivières, Quebec
 Ülle Rajasalu, Estonian politician
 Graeme Souness, Scottish footballer and manager; in Edinburgh

May 7, 1953 (Thursday)
 Born:
 Pat McInally, US National Football League punter and wide receiver; in Villa Park, California
 Ian McKay, British soldier, Victoria Cross recipient; in Wortley, South Yorkshire (d. 1982)
 Died: Ormerod Pearse, 68, South African cricketer, coronary thrombosis

May 8, 1953 (Friday)
 Born:
 Billy Burnette, American musician; in Memphis, Tennessee
 Alex Van Halen, Dutch-born American rock musician; in Amsterdam
 Died: Anna Rüling, 72, German journalist, "the first known lesbian activist"

May 9, 1953 (Saturday)
 France agrees to the provisional independence of Cambodia, with King Norodom Sihanouk.
 1953 Australian Senate election: The Liberal/Country Coalition Government, led by Prime Minister Robert Menzies, retains its Senate majority, despite gains made by the Labor Party, led by H. V. Evatt. This is the first occasion that a Senate election is held without an accompanying House of Representatives election.
 Born: Bruno Brokken, Belgian high jumper; in Wilrijk

May 10, 1953 (Sunday)
 The town of Chemnitz, East Germany, becomes Karl Marx Stadt.
The Tour de Romandie ends in Martigny, Switzerland, and is won by Hugo Koblet.  
 Born: Tito Santana (born Merced Solis), American professional wrestler; in Mission, Texas

May 11, 1953 (Monday)

 Waco tornado outbreak: An F5 tornado hits in the downtown section of Waco, Texas, killing 114.
 Born: David Gest, American entertainer, producer and television personality; in Los Angeles, California (d. 2016)
 Died: Jean Adair (born Violet McNaughton), 79, Canadian actress

May 12, 1953 (Tuesday)
 Died: American test pilot Jean "Skip" Ziegler, 33, and his observer Frank Wolko, both killed in the explosion of a Bell X-2 research aircraft in the bomb bay of a Boeing B-50 Superfortress over Lake Ontario. The X-2 falls into Lake Ontario, and it and Ziegler and Wolko's bodies are never found.

May 13, 1953 (Wednesday)
 Born:
 Zlatko Burić, Croatian-Danish actor; in Osijek, People's Republic of Croatia, Socialist Federal Republic of Yugoslavia
 Ruth A. David, American electrical engineer; in Arkansas City, Kansas
 Gerry Sutcliffe, English politician; in Salford
 Harm Wiersma, Dutch draughts player and politician; in Leeuwarden

May 14, 1953 (Thursday)

 Korean War: Future U.S. astronaut Edwin Eugene Aldrin Jr., who will participate in the first crewed Moon landing in 1969, scores his first confirmed kill as a U.S. Air Force fighter pilot. The MiG pilot ejects from the aircraft.
 Over 7000 brewery workers in Milwaukee, United States, perform a walkout, marking the start of the 1953 Milwaukee brewery strike.
The passenger liners SS Arcadia and SS Orsova are launched, in Clydebank, Scotland, and Barrow-in-Furness, England, respectively. 
 Born:
 Tom Cochrane, Canadian musician (Red Rider); in Lynn Lake, Manitoba
 Michael Hebranko, American exemplar of morbid/mortal obesity; in Brooklyn, New York City (d. 2013)
 Norodom Sihamoni, King of Cambodia; in Phnom Penh
 Hywel Williams, Welsh politician; in Pwllheli
 Died: Yasuo Kuniyoshi, 63, Japanese-American painter and photographer, of cancer

May 15, 1953 (Friday)
 Rioting begins in Kano, Nigeria. The riot will last until May 18 and result in at least 36 deaths and 241 injuries.
 The Standards and Recommended Practices (SARPS) for Aeronautical Information Service (AIS) are adopted by the ICAO Council. These SARPS are in Annex 15 to the Chicago Convention, and 15 May is celebrated by the AIS community as "World AIS Day".
 Born:
 George Brett, American Major League Baseball third baseman; in Glen Dale, West Virginia
 Athene Donald (born Athene Margaret Griffith), English physicist; in London
 Mike Oldfield, English composer (Tubular Bells); in Reading, Berkshire
 Died: Chet Miller, 50, American racing driver, as a result of a crash during practice for Indianapolis 500

May 16, 1953 (Saturday)
 Born:
 Pierce Brosnan, Irish actor; in Drogheda, County Louth
 Kitanoumi Toshimitsu, Japanese sumo wrestler, the 55th yokozuna; in Hokkaido (d. 2015)
 David Maclean, Scottish politician; in Cromarty
 Peter Onorati, American actor; in Boonton, New Jersey
 Richard Page, American musician; in Keokuk, Iowa
 Died:
 Nicolae Rădescu, 79, Romanian military officer and statesman, 45th Prime Minister of Romania, of tuberculosis
 Django Reinhardt (born Jean Reinhardt), 43, Belgian jazz musician, stroke

May 17, 1953 (Sunday)
 Born: Luca Prodan, Italian–Scottish musician and singer; in Rome (d. 1987, heart attack or cirrhosis of the liver)

May 18, 1953 (Monday)
 Born: Alan Kupperberg, American comics artist; in New York City (d. 2015)

May 19, 1953 (Tuesday)
 Born:
 Patrick Hodge, Scottish lawyer and judge
 Shavarsh Karapetyan, Armenian finswimmer; in Kirovakan, Armenian Soviet Socialist Republic, Soviet Union
 Florin Marin, Romanian footballer and manager; in Bucharest
 Victoria Wood, English comedian, actress, writer and musician; in Prestwich, Lancashire (d. 2016)
 Died: Dámaso Berenguer, 79, Spanish soldier and Prime Minister

May 20, 1953 (Wednesday)
 Born:
 Robert Doyle, Australian politician; in Melbourne, Victoria
 Norbert Siegmann, German footballer

May 21, 1953 (Thursday)
 A tornado causes widespread destruction in Port Huron, Michigan, United States, and Sarnia and London Township, Ontario, Canada, killing seven people.
 Born:
 Nora Aunor (born Nora Cabaltera Villamayor), Filipino actress and recording artist; in Iriga, Camarines Sur
 Jim Devine, British politician; in Blackburn, West Lothian, Scotland
 Died: Ernst Zermelo, 81, German logician and mathematician

May 22, 1953 (Friday)
 Born:
 François Bon, French writer and translator; in Luçon, Vendée
 Cha Bum-kun, South Korean footballer and manager; in Hwaseong, Gyeonggi
 Paul Mariner, English footballer and coach; in Farnworth (d. 2021)

May 23, 1953 (Saturday)
 Born: Agathe Uwilingiyimana, 4th Prime Minister of Rwanda; in Nyaruhengeri, Butare, Ruanda-Urundi (d. 1994, assassinated)

May 24, 1953 (Sunday)
 Pope Pius XII issues the encyclical Doctor Mellifluus, commemorating the forthcoming 800th anniversary of the death of Bernard of Clairvaux.
 Born: Alfred Molina, English actor; in Paddington, London

May 25, 1953 (Monday)
 Korean War: The Battle of the Nevada Complex begins between United Nations Command and Chinese forces. The battle will conclude on May 29 with the withdrawal of UN forces from their positions.

 Nuclear testing: At the Nevada Test Site, the United States conducts its only nuclear artillery test, Upshot-Knothole Grable, at 15:30 GMT.
 At 5:00 p.m., the first public television station in the United States officially begins broadcasting as KUHT from the campus of the University of Houston.
 Born:
 Daniel Passarella, Argentine footballer; in Chacabuco, Buenos Aires, Argentina
 Stan Sakai (born Masahiko Sakai), Japanese-born American comic artist; in Kyoto
 Gaetano Scirea, Italian footballer; in Cernusco sul Naviglio (d. 1989)
 V (born Eve Ensler), American playwright, feminist and activist; in New York City

May 26, 1953 (Tuesday)
A second round of voting takes place in the 1953 Rajya Sabha elections in India, electing members to the upper chamber.
 Born:
 Kay Hagan (born Janet Kay Ruthven), American lawyer, banking executive and politician; in Shelby, North Carolina (d. 2019, complications of Powassan virus)
 Don McAllister, English footballer and manager; in Radcliffe, Lancashire, England
 Michael Portillo, English politician, journalist and broadcaster; in Bushey, Hertfordshire

May 27, 1953 (Wednesday)
 Died: Jesse Burkett, 84, American baseball left fielder (Cleveland Spiders) and member of the MLB Hall of Fame

May 28, 1953 (Thursday)
 Korean War: The Third Battle of the Hook begins near Panmunjom, North Korea, fought between primarily British and Chinese forces. The battle will conclude the following morning and result in retention of the existing positions by both sides.
A referendum on the constitution and electoral age is held in Denmark. Both proposals are approved by voters, leading to a new Danish constitution taking effect on 5 June, and the electoral age being lowered from 25 to 23 years on the same day.
 Born: Pierre Gauthier, Canadian National Hockey League general manager; in Montreal
 Died: Tatsuo Hori, 48, Japanese author and translator, tuberculosis

May 29, 1953 (Friday)
 1953 British Mount Everest expedition: Sir Edmund Hillary from New Zealand and Tenzing Norgay from Nepal become the first men to reach the summit of Mount Everest.
 Born:
 Aleksandr Abdulov, Russian actor; in Tobolsk, Russian SFSR (d. 2008, lung cancer)
 Danny Elfman, American composer; in Los Angeles, California
 Died:
 Man Mountain Dean (born Frank Simmons Leavitt), 61, American professional wrestler, heart attack
 Morgan Russell, 67, American artist

May 30, 1953 (Saturday)
 Bill Vukovich wins the 1953 Indianapolis 500 motor race at the Indianapolis Motor Speedway, United States. Driver Carl Scarborough dies of hyperthermia after dropping out of the race.
 Born:
 Pierluigi Camiscioni, Italian rugby union player and stuntman; in San Benedetto del Tronto (d. 2020)
 Jim Hunter, Canadian Olympic alpine skier; in Shaunavon, Saskatchewan
 Colm Meaney, Irish actor; in Dublin
 Died:
 Carl Scarborough, 38, American racecar driver, hyperthermia during Indianapolis 500
 Dooley Wilson, 67, American actor, singer and musician

May 31, 1953 (Sunday)
 Towpath murders: 16-year-old Barbara Songhurst and 18-year-old Christine Reed are raped and murdered on a towpath near Teddington Lock on the River Thames. Alfred Charles Whiteway will be convicted of the murders and hanged on December 22, 1953.
The French Tennis Championships (later the French Open) come to an end, with Ken Rosewall defeating Vic Seixas to win the Men's Singles competition.
The Coupe de France Final is held at Stade Olympique Yves-du-Manoir, Colombes, France, and is won by  Lille OSC, who defeat FC Nancy.
 Born:
 Pirkka-Pekka Petelius, Finnish actor and politician; in Alatornio
 Kathie Sullivan, American singer; in Oshkosh, Wisconsin
 Died: Vladimir Tatlin, 67, Soviet and Russian painter and architect

References

1953
1953-05
1953-05